Yu Kyung-Hwa (born 22 December 1953) is a Korean former volleyball player who competed in the 1972 Summer Olympics and in the 1976 Summer Olympics.

References

1953 births
Living people
South Korean women's volleyball players
Olympic volleyball players of South Korea
Volleyball players at the 1972 Summer Olympics
Volleyball players at the 1976 Summer Olympics
Medalists at the 1976 Summer Olympics
Olympic bronze medalists for South Korea
Olympic medalists in volleyball
Place of birth missing (living people)
Asian Games medalists in volleyball
Volleyball players at the 1974 Asian Games
Volleyball players at the 1978 Asian Games
Medalists at the 1974 Asian Games
Medalists at the 1978 Asian Games
Asian Games silver medalists for South Korea
Asian Games bronze medalists for South Korea